Harold Weisberg (April 8, 1913 – February 21, 2002) served as an 
Office of Strategic Services officer during World War II, a U.S. Senate staff member and investigative reporter, an investigator for the Senate Committee on Civil Liberties, and a U.S. State Department intelligence analyst who devoted 40 years of his life to researching and writing about the assassinations of John F. Kennedy and Martin Luther King. He wrote ten self-published and published books and approximately thirty-five unpublished books related to the details for those assassinations, mostly with respect to Kennedy's assassination.

Weisberg was a strong critic of the Warren Commission report and of the methods used in investigating President Kennedy's murder. In this regard, he was avant-garde, embarking on a course that many other conspiracy theorists would later come to follow. Weisberg is best known for his seminal work, Whitewash, where he wrote: "Following thousands of hours of research in and analysis of the vast, chaotic, deliberately disorganized, padded and largely meaningless 26 volumes of the testimony and exhibits of the President's Commission on the Assassination of President John F. Kennedy and its 900-page Report – millions of words of which are not needed and are merely diversionary – I published the results of my investigation in a book, Whitewash: The Report on the Warren Report. In this book, I establish that the inquiry into the assassination was a whitewash, using as proof only what the Commission avoided, ignored, misrepresented and suppressed of its own evidence."

On February 21, 2002, Weisberg died of cardiovascular disease at his home in Frederick, Maryland.

Harold Weisberg Archive
In 1992, Weisberg decided to leave his files to Hood College, where the documents were scanned and digitized at jfk.hood.edu.

Publications

Books
 Whitewash. New York: Dell Publishing (1966).
 Whitewash II: The FBI-Secret Service Cover Up. New York: Dell Publishing (1967).
 Photographic Whitewash: Suppressed Kennedy Assassination Pictures. Frederick, Maryland: Weisberg (May 1967). .
 Oswald in New Orleans: Case for Conspiracy with the CIA. Foreword by Jim Garrison. New York: Canyon Books (1967). .
 Frame-Up: The Assassination of Martin Luther King (1970).
 Republished in 2013 by Skyhorse & Simon & Schuster with an afterword by James Earl Ray.
 Whitewash IV: Top Secret JFK Assassination Transcript, with a legal analysis by Jim Lesar. Frederick, Mary.: Weisberg (1974).
 Post Mortem: JFK Assassination Cover Up. Frederick, Maryland: Weisberg (1975).
 Martin Luther King: The Assassination (1993).
 Selections from Whitewash. New York: Carroll & Graf (1993) .
 Never Again! The Government Conspiracy in the JFK Assassination. New York: Carroll & Graf (1995). .
 Case Open: Unanswered JFK Assassination Questions. New York: Carroll & Graf (1996). .
 Also titled: Case Open: The Ommissions, Distortions and Falsifications of Case Closed.

Manuscripts
 A Citizen's Dissent. 109 p.

Articles
 "Darken Your House for... More Docule Birds Less Cannibalism." Everybody’s Poultry Magazine (October 1962): 9, 11, 36.
 "Hysteria in Meat-Tyoe Birds." Everybody’s Poultry Magazine (December 1962): 9-10, 35.

Book reviews
 Review of Reinhold Niebuhr, His Religious, Social and Political Thought by Charles Kegley and Robert W. Bretall. Jewish Social Studies, vol. 18, no. 3 (1956): 224–226. .

Speeches
 "Looking Backward to Look Ahead." Frederick, Maryland (April 20, 1975)
 "New JFK Assassination Evidence." University of Maryland (June 13, 1975)

Testimony
 Testimony, with Jim Garrison. Grand Jury Proceedings Special Investigations. Orleans Parish Grand Jury (April 28, 1967)

Other
 Film script for "JFK" (1st version) by Oliver Stone and Zachary Sklar.
This item has been digitized from Oliver Stone’s personal copy of the first version of the film script, and it contains handwritten notes from Harold Weisberg.

References

Further reading
 Orleans Parish Grand Jury Proceedings of April 28, 1967.

External links
 Harold Weisberg at IMDb
 Harold Weisberg at Spartacus Educational
 The Weisberg Archive on the JFK Assassination at Beneficial-Hodson Library, Hood College, and online via Internet Archive.
 Archive complete download (107 GB)
 Book reviews
 Interviews
 Personal appearances
 Personal military records
 Personal photos
 Speeches

1913 births
2002 deaths
American male non-fiction writers
American political writers
Researchers of the assassination of John F. Kennedy
Writers from Maryland